The Sand That Falls is the third studio album by the English multi-instrumentalist Duke Garwood. It was released by Fire Records in 2009.

Critical reception
The Line of Best Fit wrote that "this album falls awfully short and in turn would not sound out of place at an English Yoga club, replacing the mournful Whale cries usually heard within, with the unremittingly dull tone of both Garwood's guitar and voice."

Track listing

References

2009 albums
Duke Garwood albums
Fire Records (UK) albums